Bedellia terenodes is a moth in the  family Bedelliidae. It is found in India.

References

Natural History Museum Lepidoptera generic names catalog

Bedelliidae